Courage & Stupidity is a 2005 fictional American comedy film written and directed by Darin Beckstead, starring Kahil Dotay, Todd Wall, and Aaron Fiore.

History
Courage & Stupidity was released in 2005.

The film was screened at Fantasia, the Sitges Film Festival in Spain, and Plymouth Independent Film Festival. It was distributed by Netflix.

Synopsis
Courage & Stupidity reimagines Steven Spielberg's making of Jaws. It depicts a fantasy story of how the making of that movie troubled the filmmaker's early career after the mechanical shark broke down during production.

Courage & Stupidity derives its title from a statement made by Mr. Spielberg about his behind-the-scenes memories of the 1970s blockbuster. Courage & Stupidity also contains numerous easter-egg references to other Spielberg films.

Cast
 Kahil Dotay as Ricky
 Todd Wall as Steven
 Aaron Fiore as George

References

2005 films